James Douglas McGarel-Hogg, 2nd Baron Magheramorne (16 January 1861 – 10 March 1903), was an Ulster-Scots peer.

McGarel-Hogg was born in London, the son of The 1st Baron Magheramorne. He served as an officer in the Life Guards, rising to the rank of captain. He married Lady Evelyn Ashley-Cooper, the second daughter of The 8th Earl of Shaftesbury, in 1889, the year before he inherited the peerage.

Lord Magheramorne lived a dissolute life, and was unsuccessful in business. He was declared bankrupt on 23 November 1900 in Dublin and died just over two years later in Paris. The peerage was inherited by his brother. His widow remarried The Hon. Hugo Baring, younger son of The 1st Baron Revelstoke, on 1 March 1905.

References

1861 births
1903 deaths
2
British Life Guards officers
James